The economy of London is dominated by service industries, particularly financial services and associated professional services, which have strong links with the economy in other parts of the United Kingdom (UK) and internationally. In addition to being the capital city of the United Kingdom, London is one of the world's leading financial centres for international business and commerce and is one of the "command centres" for the global economy.

London is the most populous region, urban zone and metropolitan area in the United Kingdom. London had the fifth largest metropolitan economy in the world in 2011 according to the Brookings Institution. Some of its neighbourhoods have estimated per capita GVA as high as £116,800 ($162,200). The London fiscal surplus, £32.5 billion in 2016–17, mostly goes towards funding services in other parts of the UK.

London generates approximately 22 per cent of the UK's GDP. 841,000 private sector businesses were based in London at the start of 2013, more than in any other region or country in the UK. 18 per cent are in the professional, scientific and technical activities sector while 15 per cent are in the construction sector. Many of these are small and medium-sized enterprises.

GDP 

Greater London produced £503 billion while the economy of the London metropolitan area — the largest in Europe with Paris generates around 1/3 of the UK's GDP or around $1.0 trillion(in PPP).

Service industries 
London shifted to a mostly service-based economy earlier than other European cities, particularly following the Second World War. A number of factors contribute to London's success as a service industry and business centre:

 English being the native language and the dominant international language of business;
 its past role as the capital of the former British Empire;
 its position in Europe, since Europe has a population larger than that of the US, and a central time zone that allows London to act as a bridge between US and Asian markets;
 the Special Relationship between the United Kingdom and United States, and the United Kingdom's close relationships with many countries in Asia, Africa and the Middle East, particularly those in the Commonwealth of Nations;
 English contract law being the most important and most used contract law in international business; 
 a business friendly environment (e.g. relatively low taxes for corporations and non-domiciled foreign individuals; in the City of London the local government is not elected by the resident population but instead by resident businesses – the City of London is a business democracy);
 good transport infrastructure particularly its aviation industry;
 a high quality of life.

Currently, over 85% (3.2 million) of the employed population of greater London works in the service industries. Another half a million employees resident in Greater London work in manufacturing and construction, almost equally divided between both.

Business districts

London has five major business districts:  the City, Westminster, Canary Wharf, Camden & Islington and Lambeth & Southwark.  One way to get an idea of their relative importance is to look at relative amounts of office space: Greater London had 26,721,000 m2 of office space in 2001.

A useful guide to the distribution of wealth across London is the cost of renting office space. Mayfair and St. James's are historically and currently the most expensive areas – approximately £146 per sq ft per annum. The least expensive commercial districts are Waterloo & Southwark and East London Tech City, a new, but growing hub of start up technology companies, also known as Silicon Roundabout – approximately £65 per sq ft per annum.

Domestic and international corporate headquarters
The London Stock Exchange is the most international stock exchange and the largest in Europe. More than half of the London Stock Exchange top 100 listed companies (the FTSE 100) and over 100 of Europe's 500 largest companies are headquartered in central London. Over 70% of the FTSE 100 are located within London's metropolitan area, and 75% of Fortune 500 companies have offices in London. According to research by Deloitte, "London has the most internationally diverse executive community in the world, attracting business leaders from 95 nationalities and with alumni working in 134 countries".

Financial services
London's largest industry remains finance, it is the largest financial exporter in the world which makes a significant contribution to the UK's balance of payments. In the 2017 Global Financial Centres Index, London was ranked as having the most competitive financial center in the world. However, in the 2018 ranking, London has lost that title to New York City. In the 2020 Global Financial Centers Index, London was ranked as having the second most competitive financial center in the world after New York City (alongside cities such as Shanghai, Tokyo, Hong Kong, Singapore, Beijing, San Francisco, Shenzhen and Zurich in the top 10). The City of London is home to exchanges, banks, brokers, investment managers, pension funds, hedge funds, private equity firms, insurance companies and reinsurance markets. London is notable as a centre of international finance where foreign participants in financial markets come to deal with one another. It is also home to the Bank of England, the second oldest central bank in the world, and the European Banking Authority, although the latter is moving to Paris in March 2019 following the Brexit referendum of 2016. Other key institutions are Lloyd's of London for insurance, the Baltic Exchange for shipping.

A second financial district has developed at Canary Wharf to the east of the City, which includes the global headquarters of two of the world's largest banks, HSBC and Barclays, the rest-of-the-world headquarters of Citigroup and the headquarters of the global news service Reuters. London handled 36.7% of global currency transactions  – an average daily turnover of US$1.85 trillion – with more US dollars traded in London than New York, and more Euros traded than in every other city in Europe combined. London is the leading centre for international bank lending, derivatives markets, money markets, international insurance, trading in gold, silver and base metals through the London bullion market and London Metal Exchange, and issuance of international debt securities.

Financial services in London benefited from the UK's membership of the European Union, although this may end following the decision of the United Kingdom to leave the European Union.

The combination of lax regulation and London's financial institutions providing sophisticated methods to launder proceeds from criminal activity around the world, including those from drug trade, makes the City a global hub for illicit finance and London a safe haven for the world's malfeasants, according to research papers and reports published in the mid-2010s.

Professional services

London is a leading global centre for professional services. Many different types of professional service providers are located in the city including the big four accountants and major management consulting firms. London is the headquarters for four of the world's six largest law firms and is a leading international centre for legal services.

Media

Media companies are concentrated in London and the media distribution industry is London's second most competitive sector. The BBC is a key employer, other broadcasters also have headquarters around the city. Many national newspapers are edited in London, having traditionally been associated with Fleet Street in the City, they are now dispersed across the capital. Soho is the centre of London's post-production industry. Hollywood's links with the United Kingdom are centred on London, which contributes billions to the economy.

Tourism

Tourism is one of London's prime industries. London is the most visited city in the world by international tourists with 18.8 million international visitors forecast in 2015, ahead of Bangkok (18.2 million) and Paris (16.1 million). Within the UK, London is home to the ten most-visited tourist attractions. Tourism employed the equivalent of 350,000 full-time workers in London in 2003, whilst annual expenditure by tourists is around £15bn.

Technology
A growing number of technology companies are based in London, notably in East London Tech City also known as Silicon Roundabout. Investment in London's technology sector was $2.28 billion in 2015, 69 per cent higher than the $1.3 billion raised in 2014. Since 2010, London-based technology companies have collectively raised $5.2 billion of venture capital funding. A report by EY highlighted the importance of London to the UK's FinTech industry in terms of availability of expertise and demand for services.

Retail
London is a major retail centre, and in 2010 had the highest non-food retail sales of any city in the world, with a total spend of around £64.2 billion. The UK's fashion industry, centred on London, contributes tens of billions to the economy.

Manufacturing and construction

For the 19th and much of the 20th centuries London was a major manufacturing centre (see Manufacturing in London), with over 1.5 million industrial workers in 1960. Manufacturing suffered dramatic decline from the 1960s on. Entire industries have been lost including shipbuilding (which ended in 1912 after hundreds of years with the closure of the Thames Ironworks and Shipbuilding Company), consumer electronics, aircraft manufacture and most of the vehicle construction industry. This trend continues, with the loss of the pharmaceutical manufacturing sites of Aesica (formerly Merck Sharp and Dohme) at Ponders End in 2011, and Sanofi-Aventis (originally May & Baker) at Dagenham by 2013. Pharmaceutical and biotechnology companies in the United Kingdom still have a presence in London, including the world headquarters of GlaxoSmithKline.

Manufacturing
A substantial industrial plant remaining in operation is Ford Dagenham, the largest diesel engine manufacturing site in the world. Food and drink manufacture remain in places, for example baking at Warburtons in Brimsdown, biscuits at United Biscuits in Harlesden, brewing at Fuller's Brewery in Chiswick, manufacture of coffee and chocolate by Nestlé in Hayes in West London, and refining of sugar and syrup by Tate & Lyle in Silvertown. At 2.8%, London was the region containing the lowest proportion of employees engaged in UK manufacturing.

Construction
London was named the city with the best real estate investment opportunities for foreign investors in 2014. Office development was at a four-year high in 2013 with 9.7 million sq ft across 71 schemes under construction.

A multibillion-pound 10-year construction programme has begun in Nine Elms on the South Bank of the river Thames in central London. This will develop the area from a semi-derelict, light industrial zone into a modern residential and business district. The programme includes regeneration of Battersea Power Station, construction of new embassies for the United States and the Netherlands, and regeneration of New Covent Garden Market which is the largest fresh produce market in the UK. Transport improvement plans include two new Northern line tube stations, riverbus piers, new bus services and a network of cycle lanes and footpaths. A new bridge across the river Thames will link Nine Elms to Pimlico on the opposite bank. Around 25,000 permanent jobs will be created once the new buildings are occupied and around 16,000 new homes.

Other large construction projects include Kings Cross Central and Paddington Waterside. In 2014, the government identified 20 new housing zones across London, and in February 2015 the development of the first nine zones was approved, which will create 28,000 new homes by 2025 from £260m of investment.

Transport

Transportation contributes to both the service and construction sectors of the London economy.

Public transport
London has an integrated public transport system operated by Transport for London under a single electronic ticketing system, the Oyster card. The city's network successfully provided transport for the 2012 Summer Olympics. It includes the London Underground, London Overground, Docklands Light Railway, London Buses and London River Services. A ring of 18 railway stations provides train links to cities, towns and villages around the country as well international services to Paris, Brussels and Amsterdam via the high-speed Eurostar. The Thameslink rail network is undergoing a £6bn programme to upgrade and expand the line.

Crossrail
Crossrail, originally planned to open in 2018 but delayed until 2022, will be a new railway line running east to west through London and into the surrounding countryside. It will run on 118 km (73 mi) of track with a branch to Heathrow Airport. The main feature of the project is construction of 42 km (26 mi) of new tunnels connecting stations in central London including a branch to Canary Wharf in east London. It is Europe's biggest construction project with a £15 billion projected cost. An additional line, Crossrail 2, has been proposed.

Roads
Most of the streets of central London were laid out before cars were invented and London's road network is often congested. There is a £16/day congestion charge in Central London. The Ultra Low Emission Zone (ULEZ) adds an extra charge of £12.50/day for vehicles which do not meet Euro 4 standards for petrol and Euro 6 for diesel (which corresponds to vehicles made before 2007 and 2015 respectively. The ULEZ charge will be extended to the North and South Circular from October 2021.

Airports
London is served by six international airports which are the world's busiest city airport system by passenger traffic. These are Heathrow, Gatwick, Stansted, Luton, London City, and Southend.

There are a number of proposals for expanding airport capacity for London including expansion of London Heathrow Airport and expansion of Gatwick Airport. The principal argument in favour of airport expansion is to support economic growth in the UK by providing an international hub for air-transport links to fast-growing developing countries around the world. The Heathrow proposal expects to create 120,000 new jobs across the UK and bring economic benefits of more than £100 billion. It also anticipates boosting exports as a result of the expansion.

Ports
Once the largest port in the world, the Port of London is today the second-largest in the United Kingdom, handling 48 million tonnes of cargo each year. The port is not located in one area – it stretches along the tidal Thames, including central London, with many individual wharfs, docks, terminals and facilities built incrementally over the centuries. As with many similar historic European ports the bulk of activities has steadily moved downstream towards the open sea, as ships have grown larger and other city uses take up land closer to the city's centre. Today, much of the Port of London cargo passes through the Port of Tilbury, outside the boundary of Greater London.

London Gateway, the UK's newest container port, opened in 2013. The £1.5bn facility at Thurrock, Essex, is  down the River Thames from London. It is expected to be able to handle 3.5 million containers a year. The development is forecast to create 27,000 jobs in London and the South East and contribute £2.4bn a year to its economy.

See also

 Agriculture in London
 Economy of Croydon
 Economy of Europe
 Economy of the United Kingdom
 List of companies based in London

References

External links
 Labour Market Profile – London Office for National Statistics Official Labour Market Statistics (Nomis)
 Regional accounts Office for National Statistics
 Neighbourhood Statistics (NeSS)  Office for National Statistics
 London: The Global Powerhouse Greater London Authority
 Economy and employment  Greater London Authority
 Economic research and information  The City of London Corporation
 Research TheCityUK